Daljina, dim i prašina (trans. Distance, Smoke and Dust) is the ninth studio album from Serbian rock band Bajaga i Instruktori, released in 2012.

Daljina, dim i prašina album was released with the book of Bajagić's poetry entitled Vodič kroz snove (Guide through Dreams). The book featured a selection of lyrics Bajagić had written for Bajaga i Instruktori and his solo albums, as well as for other artists, and for all the songs from Daljina, dim i prašina. The album features two bonus tracks: the rerecorded version of the song "Bežiš od mene, ljubavi" (originally released as a single in 2008), and a radio edit of the song "Još jednom". As of May 2013, according to Bajagić, the album was sold in circa 30,000 copies.

In August 2013, Daljina, dim i prašina was released on vinyl, in a limited number of 200 copies only, each one signed by Bajagić.

Track listing
All songs written by Momčilo Bajagić.

Personnel
Momčilo Bajagić - vocals, electric guitar, acoustic guitar, harmonica 
Miroslav Cvetković - bass guitar - backing vocals
Saša Lokner - keyboards, organ
Žika Milenković - backing vocals, acoustic guitar
Čeda Macura - drums, backing vocals
Marko Nježić - electric guitar, backing vocals

Additional personnel
Vojislav Aralica - production, electric guitar, acoustic guitar, bass guitar, keyboards, programming
Miloš Nikolić - trumpet, trombone, horn (tracks: 2, 8)
Dejan Momčilović - drums (tracks: 4, 5)
Marko Kuzmanović - drums (track 2)
Igor Malešević - drums (track 7)
Ivan Aleksijević - piano, organ (track 2)
Alesandar Radojčić - percussion (track 8)
Demonja Nikola - tenor saxophone (track 2)
Nikola Vranjković - solo guitar (track 4)
Davor Rodik - slide guitar (track 6)
Nevena Filipović - backing vocals (track 5)
Bojana Račić - backing vocals (track 5)
Jadranka Kristof - backing vocals (tracks: 2, 9)
Darija Hodnik - backing vocals (tracks: 2, 9)
Ivana Čabraja - backing vocals (tracks: 2, 9)
Dragan Brnaš - backing vocals (track 9)
Vladimir Pavelić - backing vocals (track 9)
String of Life Quartet
Hemnalina Milešković - violin
Aleksandra Klenkovski - violin
Milica Mihailović - viola
Ana Dulović - cello
Kornelije Kovač - string arrangements

References 

Daljina, dim i prašina at Discogs

External links 
Daljina, dim i prašina at Discogs

Bajaga i Instruktori albums
2012 albums